What's Bin Did and What's Bin Hid is the debut album from Scottish singer-songwriter Donovan. It was released in the UK four days after his nineteenth birthday on 14 May 1965, through Pye Records (catalog number NPL 18117). Terry Kennedy, Peter Eden, and Geoff Stephens produced the album. The album was released in the US as Catch the Wind on Hickory Records in June 1965. Hickory Records changed the title to match that of Donovan's debut single.

History 
In late 1964, Peter Eden and Geoff Stephens offered Donovan a recording contract with Pye Records in the UK. Donovan had performed around Britain and had become well known in British folk circles before his record contract. His 1964 demo tapes (released as Sixty Four in 2004) show a great resemblance to both Woody Guthrie and Bob Dylan, which probably prompted the "British answer to Bob Dylan" press line that was subsequently released. What's Bin Did and What's Bin Hid is notable because it captures Donovan at a point where his style and vision were starting to diverge significantly from those of Guthrie and Dylan.

The music primarily consists of Donovan singing and playing mouth harp and acoustic guitar, much like his live performances of the time. He still had some vestiges of Woody Guthrie's style, and here covers Guthrie's "Riding In My Car" (titled here as "Car Car"). What's Bin Did and What's Bin Hid also includes British folk ("Tangerine Puppet") and even some jazz ("Cuttin' Out").

Donovan re-recorded "Catch the Wind" for the album, which was initially released as his debut single in the UK on 12 March 1965.

Other musicians featured on the album are Brian Locking on bass, Skip Alan (who joined the Pretty Things later the same year) on drums, and Gypsy Dave on kazoo.

Reissues 
 On 13 September 1968, What's Bin Did and What's Bin Hid was reissued in an edited form (Marble Arch Records MAL 795) in the UK. "Car Car" and "Donna Donna" were both removed from the album, possibly because they were not written by Donovan.
 On 26 February 1996, Sequel Records reissued What's Bin Did and What's Bin Hid in the US under its US title Catch the Wind on compact disc. Three bonus tracks were added to the track listing. The first bonus track, "Why Do You Treat Me Like You Do?", was released as the B-side to Donovan's UK debut single. The second bonus track is the A-side of Donovan's UK debut single. The third bonus track, "Every Man Has His Chain", was originally released on Donovan's Catch the Wind EP in France.
 On 22 January 2002, Sanctuary Records reissued the complete What's Bin Did and What's Bin Hid for the first time on compact disc. The US version of the CD titled Catch the Wind was released six years earlier. The CD features four bonus tracks. The first two tracks are Donovan's debut single "Catch the Wind" (a different take than the album track) and its b-side "Why Do You Treat Me Like You Do?". The third bonus track "Every Man Has His Chain" was once a rare track in Donovan's discography, and was originally released on the French EP Catch the Wind in 1965. Donovan's second single "Colours" is also released here, in a version different from the one included on the Fairytale album.

Track listing

Original album (UK)
Side 1
"Josie" (Donovan Leitch) – 3:28
"Catch the Wind" (Donovan Leitch) – 2:56
"Remember the Alamo" (Jane Bowers) – 3:04
"Cuttin' Out" (Leitch) – 2:19
"Car Car" (Woody Guthrie) – 1:31
"Keep on Truckin'" (traditional; arranged by Leitch) – 1:50

Side 2
"Goldwatch Blues" (Mick Softley) – 2:33
"To Sing for You" (Leitch) – 2:45
"You're Gonna Need Somebody on Your Bond" (traditional; arranged by Leitch) – 4:04
"Tangerine Puppet" (Leitch) – 1:51
"Donna Donna" (Aaron Zeitlin, Sholom Secunda, Arthur S Kevess, Teddi Schwartz) – 2:56
"Ramblin' Boy" (Leitch) – 2:33

1996 Sequel Records CD-reissue (Title: Catch the Wind)
The original album plus the following bonus tracks:
"Why Do You Treat Me Like You Do?" (Leitch)  – 2:56
"Catch the Wind" (Leitch)  – 2:18
"Every Man Has His Chain" (Leitch)  – 2:09

2002 Sanctuary Records CD-reissue
The original album plus the following bonus tracks:
"Catch the Wind" (Single version with strings) (Leitch)  – 2:18
"Why Do You Treat Me Like You Do?" (Single b-side) (Leitch)  – 2:56
"Every Man Has His Chain" (French EP track) (Leitch)  – 2:12
"Colours" (Single version) (Leitch)  – 2:45

Personnel 
 Donovan – vocals, acoustic guitar, harmonica
 Brian Locking – bass
 Skip Alan (Alan Skipper) – drums
 Gypsy Dave (David Mills) – kazoo

References

External links 
 What's Bin Did And What's Bin Hid – Donovan Unofficial Site
 Sanctuary Records

1965 debut albums
Donovan albums
Pye Records albums
Hickory Records albums
Sanctuary Records albums